Ta'ayush (lit. "coexistence" or "life in common") is a grassroots volunteer organization established in the fall of 2000 by a joint network of Palestinians and Israelis to counter the nationalist reactions aroused by the Al-Aqsa Intifada. It describes itself as "a grassroots movement of Arabs and Jews working to break down the walls of racism and segregation by constructing a true Arab-Jewish partnership. Together we strive for a future of equality, justice and peace through concrete, daily, non-violent actions of solidarity to end the Israeli occupation of the Palestinian territories and to achieve full civil equality for all."

They organized convoys of food and medical supplies to Palestinians during sieges in the Second Intifada.

Activities
In January 2005, Ta'ayush activists along with Gush Shalom, the Israeli Committee Against House Demolitions, Machsom Watch, Anarchists Against the Wall and local residents of the Palestinian village Jayyous, began to plant hundred of olive saplings which they had brought with them to the plot of land where the bulldozers of the settlers had uprooted hundreds of olive trees. Advocate Wiam Shbeyta, an activist of the Ta'ayush movement said:-

"In spite of the police and army assertions, we do not recognise the ownership of the settlers over this land. This land belongs to the Jayyous villagers and the company "Geulat HaKarka" which is associated with the settlers took control of it on the false assertion that it was sold to them. The matter is still awaiting legal review, and we will not allow the settlers to dictate facts on the ground, to grab Palestinian lands and to commence establishing a new settlement on it".

In 2007, after hearing that settlers had stolen a donkey from a Palestinian boy from Tuba, Ta'ayush went to the Havot Ma'on settlement to retrieve the donkey. The police and Israeli Defense Forces stopped them on the way to Tuba and at the entrance of Havot Ma'on. Ta'ayush activists have also aided residents of the un-recognized village of Dar al-Hanun in Wadi Ara to repave the road to the village after it was dug up by Israeli Interior Ministry employees, the demolition had been ordered by the Haifa Magistrate's Court May 2006. The village of Dar al-Hanun was founded 80 years ago by the Abu Hilal family on a hill near the Wadi Ara route, on land owned by the family. In 1949, when the land was transferred to Israeli sovereignty, the Israeli authorities did not recognize the village, and the residents were asked to move to nearby villages.

The village of Yanun was abandoned in October 2004 when the harassment of the village by Avri Ran and his people became intolerable, leaving behind only two aged people who refused to accept the village decision to go. The village was re-occupied with the aid of peace activists from Ta'ayush and the International Solidarity Movement. David Nir of Ta'ayush was assaulted by Avri Ran in Yanun.

One member, David Dean Shulman, recalls the gratitude the cave-dwellers of the South Hebron Hills express to the Ta'ayush volunteers who struggle to ensure that they can stay on their land:
The cave-dwellers tell and retell stories of the volunteers' visits the way they tell epics; for these people, Ta'ayush matters, like oxygen to the drowning'.'

In 2011 Two Jewish settlers suspected of involvement in the beating of Midhat Abu Karsh, a 30-year-old Palestinian teacher and resident of as-Samu, were arrested as a result of a video recording of the incident that released by Ta'ayush which appeared on YouTube and in Israeli television.

Political position 
Ta'ayush has been described as belonging to the radical left. The organization's activities, which, like Machsom Watch, Yesh Gvul and Women in Black are focused on specific issues, rather than an inclusive approach embracing all problems, are ignored by the Israeli mainstream but find support among Arab Palestinian parties and the extreme left. Ta'ayush has no ideology (attempts to form a constitution failed) and its members restrict their work to concrete activities of solidarity. Ta'ayush has a pacifist agenda, being opposed to both the Israeli occupation and Palestinian movements that employ violent forms of resistance. It openly opposes the measures taken by the state of Israel in the Occupied Territories, policies that lead to 'isolation, poor medical care, house arrest, the destruction of educational institutions, and a lack of water and food for Palestinians'. Ta'ayush activists underwrite civil disobedience, support a Two State Solution, and routinely break the law as they consider government's decision to be illegal according to international law and therefore illegitimate.

Ezra Nawi affair 

In January 2016, Channel 2 (Israel) broadcast footage of Ta'ayush activist Ezra Nawi boasting that he poses as a prospective Jewish purchaser of land from Palestinians, then provides the Palestinian National Security Forces with the names and telephone numbers of Palestinian land brokers willing to sell land to him. Nawi is both Jewish and Israeli, and the Palestinian legal code regards sale of land to Israelis as a capital offense. Nawi said such people are beaten and executed.  In the recording, Nawi says "The Authority catches them and kills them. But before they kill them they beat them up."

Notable members
David Dean Shulman a winner of the Israel Prize who donated the prize money to Taayush

Notes

External links
 Ta'ayush official site (in English, Hebrew, and Arabic)

Anti-racist organizations in Israel
Non-governmental organizations involved in the Israeli–Palestinian conflict
Palestinian organizations
Political organizations based in Israel
Anti-racism in Palestine